Malin Swedberg (born 15 September 1968) is a Swedish former association football midfielder who won 78 caps for the Sweden women's national football team, scoring ten goals. She represented Sweden at the inaugural FIFA Women's World Cup in 1991; as well as in the Olympic women's football tournament in 1996 and 2000.

Since retiring Swedberg has gone into television punditry and worked as a commentator on Eurosport and TV4.

Club career
As a 19-year-old, Swedberg signed a professional contract with Napoli. She only stayed in Italy for three months.

International career
Swedberg made her senior Sweden debut in March 1989; a 2–1 win over France. In 1991 she helped Sweden to a third-place finish at the inaugural FIFA Women's World Cup. Swedberg collected the Diamantbollen award for the best female footballer in the country in 1996. At that year's Olympic Football Tournament, she had scored twice in Sweden's 3–1 group stage win over Denmark.

Personal life
Since 1996, Swedberg has worked as a police officer. She is married to Hans Eskilsson and has two children, including Williot Swedberg who is also a professional footballer.

References

External links

1968 births
Living people
Swedish women's footballers
Sweden women's international footballers
Swedish police officers
Olympic footballers of Sweden
Footballers at the 1996 Summer Olympics
Footballers at the 2000 Summer Olympics
Djurgårdens IF Fotboll (women) players
Damallsvenskan players
Swedish expatriates in Italy
Serie A (women's football) players
Footballers from Stockholm
Women's association football midfielders
Sundbybergs IK players
1991 FIFA Women's World Cup players